Kyle Rehman (born 15 September 1978 in Red Deer, Alberta) is a National Hockey League (NHL) referee. He has officiated in over 637 professional NHL matches. Prior to wearing uniform number 10, he had worn the number 37.

See also
 List of NHL on-ice officials

References 

1978 births
Ice hockey people from Alberta
National Hockey League officials
Sportspeople from Red Deer, Alberta
Living people